The 2009 Purdue Boilermakers football team represented Purdue University in the 2009 NCAA Division I FBS football season. They played their home games at Ross–Ade Stadium in West Lafayette, Indiana. It was Danny Hope's first season as head coach following the retirement of Joe Tiller. The Boilermakers finished the season 5–7 (4–4 Big Ten).

Key roster returns

Offense
Jared Zwilling - Center
Ken Plue - Right Guard
Aaron Valentin - Wide Receiver
Keith Smith - Wide Receiver
Kyle Adams - Tight End

Defense
Torri Williams - Free Safety
Brandon King - Cornerback
David Pender - Cornerback
Dwight McLean - Safety
Ryan Kerrigan - Defensive End
Chris Carlino - Mid Linebacker
Joe Holland - Outside Linebacker
Mike Neal - Defensive End

Key roster losses

Offense
Curtis Painter - Quarterback
Cory Benton - Center
Kory Sheets - Running Back
Jordan Grimes - Offensive Tackle
Greg Orton - Wide Receiver

Defense
Alex Magee - Defensive End
Eugene Bright - Defensive Tackle
Anthony Heygood - Middle Linebacker
Ryan Baker - Defensive End

Schedule

Game summaries

Toledo

Sources:

    
    
    
    
    
    
    
    
    
    
    
    

To open the season, the Boilermakers played the Toledo Rockets at Ross–Ade Stadium. The Boilermakers scored first on their opening drive, with a 78-yard touchdown run by Ralph Bolden. They added to their lead 9 minutes later on a 43-yard touchdown run by Jaycen Taylor. In the second quarter, Purdue added to their lead with an 11-yard Keith Smith touchdown from Joey Elliott. Toledo then began their scoring with an Eric Page 34-yard touchdown pass from Aaron Opelt. Toledo struck again just 6 minutes later when Opelt found Stephen Williams for a 9-yard touchdown pass. Purdue responded with a 24-yard Keith Carlos touchdown pass from Elliott with 1:25 remaining in the half. Purdue was then able to get the ball back on downs from Toledo with 27 seconds remaining. After just 3 plays, Purdue called time out with 3 seconds remaining in the half. Carson Wiggs made a 59-yard field goal to end the half. The 59-yard field goal was the longest in Purdue history. Purdue would score twice to open the second half, a 1-yard run by Taylor and a 15-yard touchdown reception from Antavian Edison from Elliott. Toledo would get the next three scores, on a 5-yard touchdown run by DaJuane Collins, a 45-yard field goal by Alex Steigerwald and 42-yard Williams reception from Opelt. The 3 scores by Toledo got them with 4 points, but a 14-yard Bolden touchdown run sealed the scoring of the game.

Bolden's 234 yards rushing were the 3rd highest single game total in school history.

Oregon

Northern Illinois

Notre Dame

Northwestern

Minnesota

Ohio State

Purdue scored first with a field goal in the first quarter, but Ohio State made it 7–3 with a Pryor run for a touchdown. The second quarter was all Purdue with Boilermakers making two field goals to put them up it a 9-7 halftime. In the second half Purdue was finally able to find the end zone with two Joey Elliot touchdown passes to Valentin, making it a commanding 23–7 lead for the Boilermakers. In the fourth quarter both teams traded field goals with the score now 26–10. Purdue, however, was forced to punt midway through the fourth quarter and Ohio State quickly drove down the field to score a touchdown with a pass from Pryor to Posey, with Pryor running it in the two-point conversion. The next drive, Purdue went three and out and it seemed the momentum had shifted and Ohio State had come alive, but with a sack of Pryor and a denial of a fourth down, Purdue had the ball. After seemingly stopping Purdue, a crucial facemask penalty by the Buckeyes allowed the Boilermakers to run out the clock. This was the first time Ohio State had lost to a team that had finished the season with a losing record since a loss at Penn State in 2001.

Illinois

Wisconsin

Michigan

Source: ESPN.com
    
    
    
    
    
    
    
    
    
    
    
    

In the first quarter, Purdue scored first with a 35-yard TD catch by Ralph Bolden. Michigan tied the score with a 29-yard TD run by Brandon Minor. Purdue retook the lead with a 41-yard field goal by Carson Wiggs. Michigan tied the score soon after with a 51-yard field goal. In the second quarter, Michigan scored 2 touchdowns: a 55-yard rush by Brandon Minor, and a 43-yard catch by Ray Roundtree, giving the Wolverines a 14-point advantage at halftime.

However, Michigan would collapsed in the second half. In the third quarter, Purdue's Ralph Bolden scored his second TD of the game with a 19-yard run. Michigan QB Forcier responded with a 6-yard TD run, but the point after touchdown attempt failed. Ralph Bolden scored his third touchdown of the day soon after with a 10-yard rush. In the ensuing kickoff, Purdue made an on-side kick and recovered the ball by catching the Wolverines off guard. In the next play, Purdue's Cortez Smith caught a 54-yard TD pass and Purdue re-took the lead 31-30 after the extra point attempt was completed. In the fourth quarter, Purdue QB Joey Elliot ran in an 8-yard TD. Michigan's Minor then ran in a TD from 1-yard out. The Wolverines attempted to tie the game but Forcier failed to reach the end zone on a two-point conversion after being sacked by Ryan Kerrigan, sealing the victory for the Boilermakers. It was Purdue's first win in Michigan Stadium since 1966.

Michigan State

Indiana

Roster

After the season

2010 NFL Draft

References

Purdue
Purdue Boilermakers football seasons
Purdue Boilermakers football